The  is a Japanese railway line owned by the private railway operator Seibu Railway, connecting Seibu Shinjuku Station in Shinjuku, Tokyo with Hon-Kawagoe Station in Kawagoe, Saitama.

The Shinjuku Line is one of two main lines of the Seibu Railway system along with the Ikebukuro Line. The two main lines cross at Tokorozawa Station in Tokorozawa, Saitama. The line serves the western suburbs of Tokyo, connecting them to Shinjuku and other areas of downtown Tokyo.

Description

The line is mostly double-track, except for 1.1 km (1200 yards) of single track between Wakita Junction and Hon-Kawagoe Station. While the section from Seibu-Shinjuku to Takadanobaba is elevated, the line runs at ground level through a suburban area until Saginomiya.

Trains
Seven types of train service are operated on the line: Local, Semi Express, Express, Commuter Express, Rapid Express, Haijima Liner, and Koedo limited express, as shown below. Limited Express trains use Seibu 10000 series EMUs, and a supplementary limited express ticket is required. In addition, operation of the all-seat reserved train "Haijima Liner" using the Seibu 40000 series EMU started from March of 2018. The "Haijima Liner" only operates in one direction, from Seibu-Shinjuku to Haijima.

There are regular through operations to the Haijima Line and the Kokubunji Line. There are also occasional through services to Seibukyūjō-mae Station in order to bring fans to the Seibu Dome for Saitama Seibu Lions baseball games. The Seibu Shinjuku Line is one of the few major commuter rail lines in Tokyo that does not have through service to the Tokyo Metro or Toei Subway network.

Stations

O: stop
|: pass
△: Boarding passengers only
 L:  stop at all stations, not shown
 SE: 
 E: 
 CE: 
 RE: 
 HL: 
 LE:

Rolling stock

Currently on service

Commuter trains 
 Seibu 2000 Series・Seibu new 2000 Series
 Seibu 6000 Series
 Seibu 20000 Series
 Seibu 30000 Series
 Seibu 40000 Series

Limited express trains 
 Seibu 10000 Series

History
The oldest section of the Shinjuku Line is between Higashi-Murayama Station and Hon-Kawagoe Station. The initial Kawagoe Railway route opened between Kokubunji and Kumegawa in 1894; this portion is now known as the Seibu Kokubunji Line. Its northward extension to Kawagoe, the first part of what is now the Seibu Shinjuku Line, opened in 1895. Following several mergers and name changes between 1920 and 1922, the Kawagoe Railway became part of the Seibu Railway.

The rest of the line was electrified at the same time.

The Higashi-Murayama to Tokorozawa section was double-tracked between 1950 and 1958, with the Tokorozawa to Irimagawa section double-tracked between 1967 and 1975. The rest of the line (except for the section between the Wakita Junction and Hon-Kawagoe Station) was double-tracked between 1980 and 1991.

In 1952, a dual-track extension from Takadanobaba to Seibu-Shinjuku Station was completed. At this time the line was renamed the Shinjuku Line, integrating the Murayama Line and the northern section of the Kawagoe Line. The new Seibu-Shinjuku terminal was built as a temporary station, as Seibu planned to extend the line to the second floor of what is now known as Lumine Est on the east side of Shinjuku Station. This plan was later scrapped due to insufficient space to handle trains longer than six cars. 
Seibu-Shinjuku Station was expanded to include a high-rise hotel in 1977.

From the start of the revised timetable on 30 June 2012, the and services were abolished.

Station numbering was introduced on all Seibu Railway lines during fiscal 2012, with Seibu Shinjuku Line stations numbered prefixed with the letters "SS"(SeibuShinjuku line).

From the timetable revision on 14 March 2020, the limited-stop  was reinstated for weekend and holiday services.

Express Tunnel 
In the 1980s, Seibu drew up a plan to build an underground line for express trains between Seibu-Shinjuku and Kami-Shakujii, including a new underground station between Seibu-Shinjuku and the Metro Promenade. This plan was indefinitely postponed in 1995 due to costs and a decline in passenger ridership versus previous projections. Seibu was also a bidder to acquire the former JR freight terminal site in 1989, where they planned to build a new underground terminal; Takashimaya won the bid and constructed the Takashimaya Times Square complex on the site. In 2019, the Tokyo Metropolitan Government officially cancelled the plan.

Future Expansion

Through operations with the Tokyo Metro Tozai Line 
During the 1960s, Seibu unsuccessfully negotiated with the Teito Rapid Transit Authority to offer through service between the Seibu Shinjuku Line and Tozai Line. Seibu's approach was rejected in favor of through operation with the Chuo Main Line. At Takadanobaba station, the interchange between the Seibu Shinjuku Line and Tozai Line involves passing through a few levels from the elevated Seibu Shinjuku line platform to the underground Tozai line platform. The transfer is considerably crowded during the rush hour, as Takadanobaba is the busiest station on the entire Seibu Shinjuku Line. On March 9, 2015, the Nakano Ward Council released a proposal for through operations between the Seibu Shinjuku Line and Tokyo Metro Tozai Line by constructing an underground connection between the two lines to remove the transfer between the two lines. In September 2020, Seibu Railway President Kimio Kitamura said during an interview with the Toyo Keizai that there have been many complaints from passengers heading to the city center on the Seibu Shinjuku Line and Seibu is considering various options to address this issue, such as getting through service into the Tokyo Metro Tozai Line.

Grade Separation Projects 
Initial work has started on grade separating the line from Nogata to Iogi Stations and from Iogi to Seibu-Yagisawa Stations. Proposals are being done to for grade separating the line from Tanashi to Hanakoganei Stations and from Takadanobaba to Nakai Stations.

See also
 List of railway lines in Japan

References
This article incorporates material from the corresponding article in the Japanese Wikipedia

External links

 Seibu Railway website 

 
Shinjuku Line
Railway lines in Tokyo
Rail transport in Saitama Prefecture
1067 mm gauge railways in Japan
Railway lines opened in 1895
1895 establishments in Japan